There are at least 46 named mountains in Stillwater County, Montana.
 Antelope Point, el. 
 Antelope Point, el. 
 Arch Rock, el. 
 Battle Butte, el. 
 Beehive Rock, el. 
 Big Mountain, el. 
 Black Butte, el. 
 Busteed Hill, el. 
 Cathedral Peak, el. 
 Cow Face Hill, el. 
 Fishtail Butte, el. 
 Froze-to-Death Mountain, el. 
 Hodges Mountain, el. 
 Horse Butte, el. 
 Hugh Henry Hill, el. 
 Huntley Butte, el. 
 Jones Hill, el. 
 Limestone Butte, el. 
 Lindemulder Hill, el. 
 Little Park Mountain, el. 
 Locomotive Butte, el. 
 Love Hill, el. 
 Madison Grade, el. 
 Miller Butte, el. 
 Monument Butte, el. 
 Mosquito Peak, el. 
 Mount Hague, el. 
 Mount Hole-in-the-Wall, el. 
 Mount Wood, el. 
 Mud Butte, el. 
 Nellies Twin Buttes, el. 
 Pershing Hill, el. 
 Pershing Hill, el. 
 Prairieview Mountain, el. 
 Pyramid Mountain, el. 
 Saddleback Mountain, el. 
 Square Butte, el. 
 Storm Mountain, el. 
 Tumble Mountain, el. 
 Twin Buttes, el. 
 Twin Peaks, el. 
 Two Sisters, el. 
 Warner Hill, el. 
 Wash Bowl Butte, el. 
 Wildcat Mountain, el. 
 Yancey Hill, el.

See also
 List of mountains in Montana
 List of mountain ranges in Montana

Notes

Stillwater